Rhodri Davies (born 14 October 1991) is a Welsh rugby union player who plays for the Dragons as a scrum-half. He was a Wales sevens international.

Davies joined the Dragons in 2018 having previously played for the Scarlets academy, Scarlets and Rotherham Titans while also enjoying a spell on loan at Cardiff Blues.

References

External links 
Dragons profile
itsrugby.co.uk profile

1991 births
Living people
Dragons RFC players
Rugby union players from Crymych
Welsh rugby union players
Rugby union scrum-halves